Jesús District is one of twelve districts of the province Cajamarca in Peru.

References